Acidothermus cellulolyticus is a species of gram-variable bacteria. It is the only member of the genus Acidothermus and the family Acidothermaceae.

History
A. cellulolyticus was first isolated from acidic hot springs at Yellowstone National Park in 1987.

Etymology
The name Acidothermus derives from:Latin adjective acidus, sour, acid; Greek adjective thermos (θερμός), hot; New Latin masculine gender noun Acidothermus, acid and hot (loving).

The specific epithet cellulolyticus derives from  New Latin noun cellulosum, cellulose; New Latin masculine gender adjective lyticus (from Greek masculine gender adjective lutikos (λυτικός)), able to loose, able to dissolve; New Latin masculine gender adjective cellulolyticus, cellulose-dissolving.)

References 

Bacteria genera
Actinomycetia
Monotypic bacteria genera